Terence John "Terry" Prindiville (born 20 November 1942) is an Australian former cricketer who played for the Western Australia cricket team from 1969 to 1972. The older brother of Kevin Prindiville, who also played cricket for Western Australia, he played mainly as an opening batsman, appearing in twelve first-class matches and three List A matches. He made one century, a score of 107, and also took three wickets bowling slow left-arm orthodox spin.

References

1942 births
Australian cricketers
Living people
People educated at Aquinas College, Perth
Cricketers from Perth, Western Australia
Western Australia cricketers